Grégory Pujol (born 25 January 1980) is a French professional footballer who plays as a striker for French amateur club Saint-Amand FC.

Career
Pujol's previous clubs are FC Nantes, R.S.C. Anderlecht and CS Sedan. With the Belgian side, after spending the entire season on the bench, he profited from starter Nicolás Frutos's injury to leave his mark (11 games, 4 goals) on a team that won that season's Jupiler League title.
 	
After suffering relegation to Ligue 2 with Valenciennes in the 2013–14 season, Pujol left the club and signed a two-year contract with the promoted team Gazélec Ajaccio.

Pujol came out of retirement after three years in June 2019, and joined French amateur club Saint-Amand Football Club.

References

External links
 
 

1980 births
Living people
French people of Catalan descent
French footballers
Association football forwards
FC Nantes players
R.S.C. Anderlecht players
CS Sedan Ardennes players
Valenciennes FC players
Gazélec Ajaccio players
Ligue 1 players
Ligue 2 players
Belgian Pro League players
Expatriate footballers in Belgium
Mediterranean Games bronze medalists for France
Mediterranean Games medalists in football
Competitors at the 2001 Mediterranean Games